Dorothy Parke (29 July 1904 – 15 February 1990) was a composer and music teacher from Northern Ireland, noted for children's works.

She was born in County Londonderry, Ireland, and studied piano with Ambrose Coviello and composition with Paul Corder at the Royal Academy of Music in London (LRAM, 1929). After completing her studies, she settled in Belfast and married Douglas Brown, a musician and teacher. Between 1930 and 1960 Parke taught music in Belfast and worked as a composer. Among her pupils were Norma Burrowes and Derek Bell.  She died in Portrush, County Antrim.

Works
Parke composed songs and piano solos, choral and vocal music. Selected works include:

St. Columba's Poem on Derry, solo song
A Song of Good Courage, solo song
The House and The Road, solo song
The Road to Ballydare, solo song
To The Sailors, solo song
Like A Snowy Field (1951) choral miniature
Wynkyn, Blynkyn and Nod (1949) choral miniature

References

1904 births
1990 deaths
20th-century classical composers
20th-century musicians from Northern Ireland
20th-century women composers
20th-century women musicians from Northern Ireland
Alumni of the Royal Academy of Music
Composers from Northern Ireland
Classical composers from Northern Ireland
Women classical composers from Northern Ireland
Irish classical composers
Irish women classical composers
Irish music educators
Musicians from County Londonderry
Women music educators